Armel Tchakounté Njonga (born December 22, 1988) is a retired Cameroonian professional footballer who most notably played for Queens Park Rangers following a transfer from non-league club Carshalton Athletic.

Career

Early career
Tchakounté played competitive football in Cameroon before moving to France playing for Grenoble followed by Hong Kong where he joined Buler Rangers. He later played for Kitchee. He then moved to the UK and played for the non-league side Carshalton Athletic F.C. in the 2005/2006 season. He then got his big break, signing for Championship side Queens Park Rangers in July 2006.

Buler Rangers
Armel Tchakounté initially signed a two-year contract with Hong Kong Premier League side Buler Rangers. During his time at the club, the centre midfield player was described as a "Rock" due to his strength and power on the ground and in the air. He scored two goals for his side and played an important role in helping the side compete at the top of the league. This led to him attracting the attention of other teams such as South China, Kitchee and many more. After six months of playing for Buler Rangers, he earned the opportunity to sign for league leaders Kitchee, where he was described as one of the best centre midfielders they'd ever had.

Carshalton Athletic 
On moving to the UK, Tchakounte was signed by English non-league side Carshalton Athletic at the beginning of January 2006. At the time, Athletics were struggling at the bottom of the Conference South league table.
Tchakounte made his debut with the FA Trophy second round clash with Accrington Stanley and scored a magnificent goal. He then made his full league debut in the away fixture at the fellow relegation strugglers Hayes on 26 March 2006. His full playing record at Carshalton was 19 games and 2 substitute appearances. He was an unused substitute on 2 occasions, scoring 5 goals.

Queens Park Rangers 
On 5 May 2006, Carshalton announced on their official website that Armel Tchakounté had signed for the Football League Championship club; the Queens Park Rangers on a one-year deal after spending the final three weeks of the 2005–06 season with them. Upon his arrival, the Cameroonian midfielder was announced as a player to help them being promoted. However, he only managed four first team games and was an unused substitute on five occasions. The record also showed that he played six times for the reserve team before an injury in January 2007 brought his season to an abrupt halt.

International career 
Armel earned his first cap with Cameroon under 18 a few weeks before his 16th birthday in a 3-1 win against Chad in Yaounde. He was the youngest player on the field but managed to imposed his authority in the midfield which led him to his first senior cap. The record also showed that he was called into the senior squad five times.

Style of play 
Armel was a complete and versatile midfield, gifted with excellent technical ability, vision and passing range as well as powerful shot from distance, which enabled him to start attacking plays in midfield after winning back possession. He was also a strong, tenacious, hardworking, aggressive and physical player. In addition to these attributes, his pressing ability and stamina allowed him to link up the defense with the attack  successfully.

Post retirement 
After his football career ended prematurely, Tchakounté decided to channel his efforts into football coaching and his academic studies. He obtained a Bachelor of Science Physics in 2010 and also a UEFA B Licence. He also obtained an MBA in International Business Management and a Masters in Banking and Finance at the University of Surrey. Armel was a pundit for Voxafrica's coverage of the 2015 African Cup of Nations. He currently lives in London.

References

External links

1988 births
Living people
Alumni of the University of Surrey
Queens Park Rangers F.C. players
Carshalton Athletic F.C. players
Hong Kong Rangers FC players
Cameroonian footballers
Expatriate footballers in Hong Kong
Hong Kong First Division League players
Expatriate footballers in England
Cameroonian expatriates in Hong Kong
Association football midfielders
Association football central defenders